The Two Towers is the second volume of J. R. R. Tolkien's high fantasy novel The Lord of the Rings. It is preceded by The Fellowship of the Ring and followed by The Return of the King.

Title and publication
The Lord of the Rings is composed of six "books", aside from an introduction, a prologue and six appendices. However, the novel was originally published as three separate volumes, due to post-World War II paper shortages and size and price considerations. The Two Towers covers Books Three and Four.

Tolkien wrote: "The Two Towers gets as near as possible to finding a title to cover the widely divergent Books Three and Four; and can be left ambiguous." At this stage he planned to title the individual books. The proposed title for Book Three was The Treason of Isengard. Book Four was titled The Journey of the Ringbearers or The Ring Goes East. The titles The Treason of Isengard and The Ring Goes East were used in the Millennium edition. In other editions the Books are often untitled.

In letters to Rayner Unwin, Tolkien considered naming the two as Orthanc and Barad-dûr, Minas Tirith and Barad-dûr, or Orthanc and the Tower of Cirith Ungol. However, a month later, he wrote a note published at the end of The Fellowship of the Ring, and later drew a cover illustration, both of which identified the pair as Minas Morgul and Orthanc. In the illustration, Orthanc is shown as a black tower, three-horned, with the sign of the White Hand beside it; Minas Morgul is a white tower, with a thin waning moon above it, in reference to its original name, Minas Ithil, the Tower of the Rising Moon. Between the two towers a Nazgûl flies.

Contents

Some editions of the volume contain a Synopsis for readers who have not read the earlier volumes. The body of the volume consists of Book Three: The Treason of Isengard, and Book Four: The Ring Goes East. Book III: The Treason of Isengard 

A party of large Orcs, Uruk-hai, sent by Saruman, and other Orcs sent by Sauron and led by Grishnákh, attack the Fellowship. Boromir tries to protect Merry and Pippin from the Orcs, but they kill him and capture the two hobbits. Aragorn, Gimli and Legolas decide to pursue the Orcs taking Merry and Pippin to Saruman. In the kingdom of Rohan, the Orcs are killed by Riders of Rohan, led by Éomer. Merry and Pippin escape into Fangorn Forest, where they are befriended by Treebeard, the oldest of the tree-like Ents. Aragorn, Gimli and Legolas track the hobbits to Fangorn. There they unexpectedly meet Gandalf.

Gandalf explains that he killed the Balrog. He was also killed in the fight, but was sent back to Middle-earth to complete his mission. He is clothed in white and is now Gandalf the White, for he has taken Saruman's place as the chief of the wizards. Gandalf assures his friends that Merry and Pippin are safe. Together they ride to Edoras, capital of Rohan. Gandalf frees Théoden, King of Rohan, from the influence of Saruman's spy Gríma Wormtongue. Théoden musters his fighting strength and rides with his men to the ancient fortress of Helm's Deep, while Gandalf departs to seek help from Treebeard.

Meanwhile, the Ents, roused by Merry and Pippin from their peaceful ways, attack and destroy Isengard, Saruman's stronghold, and flood it, trapping the wizard in the tower of Orthanc. Gandalf convinces Treebeard to send an army of Huorns to Théoden's aid. He brings an army of Rohirrim to Helm's Deep, and they defeat the Orcs, who flee into the forest of Huorns, never to be seen again. Gandalf, Théoden, Legolas, and Gimli ride to Isengard, and are surprised to find Merry and Pippin relaxing amidst the ruins. Gandalf offers Saruman a chance to turn away from evil. When Saruman refuses to listen, Gandalf strips him of his rank and most of his powers. After Saruman leaves, Wormtongue throws down a hard round object to try to kill Gandalf. Pippin picks it up; Gandalf swiftly takes it, but Pippin steals it in the night. It is revealed to be a palantír, a seeing-stone that Saruman used to speak with Sauron, and that Sauron used to ensnare him. Sauron sees Pippin, but misunderstands the circumstances. Gandalf immediately rides for Minas Tirith, chief city of Gondor, taking Pippin with him.

 Book IV: The Ring Goes East 

Frodo and Sam, heading for Mordor, struggle through the barren hills and cliffs of the Emyn Muil. They become aware they are being watched and tracked; on a moonlit night they capture Gollum, who has followed them from Moria. Frodo makes Gollum swear to serve him, as Ringbearer, and asks him to guide them to Mordor. Gollum leads them across the Dead Marshes. Sam overhears Gollum debating with his alter ego, Sméagol, whether to break his promise and steal the Ring.

They find that the Black Gate of Mordor is too well guarded, so instead they travel south through the land of Ithilien to a secret pass that Gollum knows. On the way, they are captured by rangers led by Faramir, Boromir's brother, and brought to the secret fastness of Henneth Annûn. Faramir resists the temptation to seize the Ring and, disobeying standing orders to arrest strangers found in Ithilien, releases them.

Gollum – who is torn between his loyalty to Frodo and his desire for the Ring – guides the hobbits to the pass, but leads them into the lair of the great spider Shelob in the tunnels of Cirith Ungol. Frodo holds up the gift given to him in Lothlórien: the Phial of Galadriel, which holds the light of Eärendil's star. The light drives Shelob back. Frodo cuts through a giant web using his sword Sting. Shelob attacks again, and Frodo falls to her venom. Sam picks up Sting and the Phial. He seriously wounds and drives off the monster. Believing Frodo to be dead, Sam takes the Ring to continue the quest alone. Orcs find Frodo; Sam overhears them and learns that Frodo is still alive, but is separated from him.

Reception 

Donald Barr in The New York Times gave a positive review, calling it "an extraordinary work – pure excitement, unencumbered narrative, moral warmth, barefaced rejoicing in beauty, but excitement most of all".

Anthony Boucher, reviewing the volume in The Magazine of Fantasy & Science Fiction, wrote that The Two Towers "makes inordinate demands upon the patience of its readers" with passages which "could be lopped away without affecting form or content". Nevertheless, he lavished praise on the volume, saying "no writer save E. R. Eddison has ever so satisfactorily and compellingly created his own mythology and made it come vividly alive ... described in some of the most sheerly beautiful prose that this harsh decade has seen in print."

The Times Literary Supplement called it a "prose epic in praise of courage" and stated that Tolkien's Westernesse "comes to rank in the reader's imagination with Asgard and Camelot".

Mahmud Manzalaoui, in the Egyptian Gazette, wrote that the book "has not pleased readers of the staple modern
psychological novel", but that it signified a new trend in fiction.

John Jordan, reviewing the book for the Irish Press, wrote admiring its narrative "weaving of epic, heroic romance, parable, and fairy tale, and the more adventurous kind of detective story, into a pattern at once strange and curiously familiar to our experience". He compared the wizard Gandalf's death and reappearance to Christ's resurrection.

References

Sources

External links 

 

1954 British novels
1954 fantasy novels
Allen & Unwin books
British novels adapted into films
Middle-earth books
The Lord of the Rings